Saleban Essa Ahmed "Haglotosiye",  is a prominent Somali politician who was the leader of the SSC Movement and served as Somaliland's Minister of Health.
 
Haglotosiye has had an elaborate career in Somali politics, in 2009 he run as presidential candidate in the Puntland elections. After he lost the election he created Hoggaanka Badbaadada iyo Mideynta SSC (HBM-SSC), which had a main purpose of liberating the Sool, Sanaag and Ayn regions from Somaliland. However, he joined Somaliland after an agreement in 2012.

Personal life
Haglotosiye was born in Hargeisa in 1968 and was brought up in Buuhoodle till he moved to Mogadishu to study at the Somali National University in 1980. 
He belongs to the Reer Hagar clan within the Ararsame sub-section under the Ahmed Gerad sub clan of Dhulbahante.

Career
From 2010, Xaglatoosiye served as the leader of Hoggaanka Badbaadada iyo Mideynta SSC (HBM-SSC), until 2012 when the organisation was replaced by Khatumo State in a grand conference which took place in Taleex. After this conference Xaglatoosiye changed his political position and reached an agreement with Somaliland. His was appointed as the Minister of Health in 2013.

References

Somaliland politicians
Government ministers of Somaliland
Health ministers of Somaliland
Somali National University alumni
People from Hargeisa
Living people
1968 births